Nahirne, (the first name of Annaberg) is a village (selo) in Stryi Raion, Lviv Oblast, of Western Ukraine. Nahirne is located in the Ukrainian Carpathians, within the limits of the Eastern Beskids (Skole Beskids) in southern part of the oblast. It belongs to Kozova rural hromada, one of the hromadas of Ukraine. Local government — Smozhenska village council.

The village was established around 1835, by Karl Scheiff, the heir of Smozhe. He invited Catholic German settlers from Western Bohemia to form an agricultural colony of Annaberg, fueling the society of Galician Germans. In the same year two other nearby German colonies were established in the same way, Felizienthal and Karlsdorf, forming a small language island.

Until 18 July 2020, Nahirne belonged to Skole Raion. The raion was abolished in July 2020 as part of the administrative reform of Ukraine, which reduced the number of raions of Lviv Oblast to seven. The area of Skole Raion was merged into Stryi Raion.

References

External links 
 Населенні пункти Сколівського району  -  Нагірне 
 weather.in.ua

Villages in Stryi Raion